The Witching Hour was an American comic book horror anthology published by DC Comics from 1969 to 1978.

Publication history 
The series was published for 85 issues from February–March 1969 to October 1978. Its tagline was "It's 12 o'clock... The Witching Hour!" and was changed to "It's midnight..." from issue #14 onwards. The series was originally edited by Dick Giordano, who was replaced by Murray Boltinoff with issue #14. Nick Cardy was the cover artist for The Witching Hour for issues #1–6, 11–12, 15–16, 18–52, and 60. Stories in the comic were "hosted" and introduced by three witches, Mordred, Mildred, and Cynthia, initially designed by artist Alex Toth.

After The Witching Hours cancellation as a result of the "DC Implosion", the title was merged with The Unexpected until issue #209. The witches were later revived along with the hosts of the companion series House of Secrets and House of Mystery as important characters in Neil Gaiman's The Sandman.

 Vertigo limited series 
Vertigo published an unrelated The Witching Hour limited series by writer Jeph Loeb and artists Chris Bachalo and Art Thibert in 1999–2000.

 2013 one-shot 
The Witching Hour title was revived for a one-shot anthology by Vertigo in 2013.

 2018 crossover storyline 
Wonder Woman & Justice League Dark: The Witching Hour is a five–part weekly crossover storyline published in two one-shots and the main Wonder Woman and Justice League Dark series. The crossover featured Wonder Woman and Justice League Dark teaming up to defeat Hecate. The entire crossover received positive reviews.

 Critical reception 
According to Comic Book Roundup, the 2018 series received a score of 8.2 out of 10 based on 98 reviews.

 Collected editions
 Showcase Presents: The Witching Hour''' collects The Witching Hour'' #1–19, 544 pages, March 2011,

References

External links 

The Witching Hour and The Witching Hour vol. 2 at Mike's Amazing World of Comics

1969 comics debuts
1978 comics endings
1999 comics debuts
2000 comics endings
2013 comics debuts
2013 comics endings
2018 comics debuts
2018 comics endings
Comics anthologies
Characters created by Alex Toth
Comics by Arnold Drake
Comics by Bob Haney
Comics by Carl Wessler
Comics by Dennis O'Neil
Comics by George Kashdan
Comics by Gerry Conway
Comics by Jeph Loeb
Comics by Marv Wolfman
Comics by Neal Adams
DC Comics one-shots
Defunct American comics
Fantasy comics
Horror comics
Fiction about witchcraft